Uday Chand Dutt or Udoy Chand Dutt (1834-1884) was a physician and expert on Ayurveda who served as a civil medical officer at Serampore, Bengal, India and wrote the Materia Medica of the Hindus, a major translation of Sanskrit works into English, first published in 1870. This book included translations of a number of Sanskrit sources on traditional Indian medicine into English and later revisions included a glossary of the botanical names was provided by Sir George King. Dutt helped Sir George Watt in producing his Dictionary of the economic plants of India and his work is widely cited. An edition in 1877 included revisions by Binod Lall Sen, Kaviraj (a title for native practitioners of medicine) Ashutosh Sen, and Kaviraj Pulin Krishna Sen (Kavibhushan).

Dutt also wrote other books including Nidana: A Sanskrit System Of Pathology. This was a translation of a Sanskrit work called Nidāna compiled by a low-caste Hindu named Madhava Kara for use by those classes which did not have access to the works of Charaka and Susruta.

References

External links
 1877 edition
 Revised edition, 1922

Ayurvedacharyas
1834 births
1884 deaths